"Average Inadequacy" is a song written and recorded by the Australian synthpop band Machinations. It was released in August 1981 as the band's debut single.

Mushroom Records's imprint White Label Records were interested and ultimately signed the band late in 1981, and the single was re-released in March 1982 under the White Label Records. The song peaked at number 98 on the Australian Kent Music Report in May 1982.

Track listing
 Phantom Records 7" Single (PH-12)
 Side A "Average Inadequacy" - 4:15
 Side B "Arabia" - 4:44

 White Label Records 7" Single (K 8581)
 Side A "Average Inadequacy" - 4:04
 Side B "Machinations of Dance" - 3:37

Charts

References 

1981 songs
Machinations (band) songs
1981 singles
1982 singles